Between You and Me may refer to:

Music

Albums
 Between You and Me (album), a 2020 album by San Cisco
 Between You and Me, a 2007 album by Fabienne Delsol
 Between You & Me, a 2016 EP by Belmont
 Starp tevi un mani, a 2003 album by Z-Scars

Songs
 "Between You and Me" (DC Talk song), released in 1996
 "Between You and Me", a song by Graham Parker from the album Howlin' Wind, 1976
 "Between You and Me", a song by Jean-Luc Ponty from the album Aurora, 1976
 "Between You and Me", a song by Johnny Hates Jazz from the album Tall Stories, 1991
 "Between You and Me", a song by the Ataris from the album Look Forward to Failure, 1998
 "Between You and Me", a song by Marillion from the album Anoraknophobia, 2001
 "Between You and Me", a song by Hilary Duff from the album Dignity, 2007
 "Between You and Me", a 2010 song by the Raw Men Empire
 "Between You and Me", a song by Suffrajett
 "Between You & Me" (Betty Who song), released in 2018
 "Between You & Me", a song by ABC from the album How to Be a ... Zillionaire!, 1985
 "Between You & Me", a song by D.A.D. from the album Soft Dogs, 2002

Film
 Between You and Me (Dangsingwa na sa-i-e), a 1971 South Korean film

Literature
 Between You and Me, a 1919 book by Harry Lauder
 Between You and Me: A Heartfelt Memoir on Learning, Loving, and Living, a 1989 autobiographical book by Pearl Bailey
 Between You and Me: A Memoir, a 2005 autobiographical book by Mike Wallace
 Between You & Me: Confessions of a Comma Queen, a 2015 book by Mary Norris
 Between You and Me: Queer Disclosures in the New York Art World, a book by Gavin Butt

See also
 Between you and I
 Just Between You and Me (disambiguation)
 Just Between Us (disambiguation)